Philippe Carbonneau (born 15 April 1971) is a retired French rugby player.

He was a utility back. His usual positions were scrum-half and fly-half, although he started his career as a centre.
He made his international test debut on 17 October 1995 as a replacement against Romania; "Grand Slam" in 1997 and 1998.

References

External links
 Euro club rugby profile

Living people
Rugby union players from Toulouse
French rugby union players
Rugby union scrum-halves
Stade Toulousain players
CA Brive players
France international rugby union players
1971 births
Section Paloise players
Tarbes Pyrénées Rugby players
US Dax players